The UCLA School of Education and Information Studies (UCLA Ed & IS) is one of the academic and professional schools at the University of California, Los Angeles. Located in Los Angeles, California, the school combines two distinguished departments whose research and doctoral training programs are committed to expanding the range of knowledge in education, information science, and associated disciplines. Established in 1881, the school is the oldest unit at UCLA, having been founded as a normal school prior to the establishment of the university. It was incorporated into the University of California in 1919.

The school offers a wide variety of doctoral and master's degrees, including the MA, MEd, MLIS, EdD, and PhD, as well as professional certificates and credentials in education and information studies. It also hosts visiting scholars and a number of research centers, institutes, and programs. Ed&IS recently initiated an undergraduate major in Education & Social Transformation in addition to the minor that it has offered in Education Studies.

Both of its departments have consistently ranked highly among graduate schools of education and Master's of Library and Information Science by U.S. News & World Report in every year in which the magazine has published such rankings. U.S. News & World Report does not rank doctoral programs in information studies, but the information studies faculty consistently ranks among the most productive and highly cited faculty in its field, according to a standard quadrennial peer-reviewed study by professors within that field. Ed&IS faculty are members of the American Academy of Arts and Sciences, Institute of Medicine, American Association for the Advancement of Science, and the National Academy of Education.

Admission to Ed&IS is highly selective, particularly admission to the departments' doctoral programs; between 60 and 70% of those admitted enroll. Roughly 150 doctoral students in education and 8 doctoral students in information studies are admitted to the school each year. Each class in the two-year MLIS and MA programs in information studies has approximately 80 students, while each class in the one-year MEd and MA programs in education has approximately 250 students.

Since 1994, the name of the school has been the UCLA Graduate School of Education and Information Studies (GSE&IS). In 2020, it was changed to UCLA School of Education and Information Studies (Ed & IS) to reflect its expanding mission to serve undergraduates as well as graduate students.

Location
Because of the school's size, Ed & IS is located in three buildings on the UCLA campus in Westwood, Los Angeles. Moore Hall primarily houses the school's administration and education faculty. Built in 1930 and designed by George W. Kelham, Moore Hall is among the most architecturally significant buildings at UCLA, an example of the school's original Romanesque Revival style. During the campus' expansion during the 1950s, the modernist architect Kemper Nomland refurbished Moore Hall. The building was again refurbished by the Los Angeles-based architectural firm Robert Englekirk & Associates in 1993. Moore Hall is located directly south of Powell Library, adjacent to Bruin Walk, Kerkhoff Hall and Ackerman Union, in the middle of campus.

The Mathematical Sciences Building (popularly known as "Math Sciences") houses some of the school's research centers, programs, and institutes, in addition to the administrative and faculty offices of the Mathematical Sciences. The building was built in 1957 and designed by Stanton & Stockwell in the mid-century modernist style. The Mathematical Sciences Building is located in the middle of campus, directly south of Moore Hall, at the north-west corner of the Court of Sciences. The GSEIS Building primarily houses the information studies faculty and computer and research labs. Built in 1991, the building is located in the northern part of the UCLA campus, off Sunset Boulevard, directly adjacent to the Charles E. Young Research Library, UCLA's main research library.

History
The UCLA School of Education and Information Studies can trace its history back to a state legislative act in 1881 that established a "southern branch" of the California State Normal School in Los Angeles. When it opened in 1882 (on what is now the site of the Central Library of the Los Angeles Public Library system), its primary responsibility was teacher training. The Department of Education was established in 1894. The school was renamed the Los Angeles State Normal School in 1914, and in 1917 the school was moved to a larger site on Vermont Avenue (on what is now the site of Los Angeles City College). The new facility included an elementary school where teachers-in-training could practice their teaching technique on children. That same year Ernest Carroll Moore (for whom Moore Hall is named) was appointed its director. The University of California opened its southern branch in 1919 by replacing the Los Angeles State Normal School with the University's Teachers College. A southern branch of the College of Letters and Science, which enrolled considerably fewer students than the Teachers College, was also established as part of the campus. Moore became director of the southern campus (later provost) and dean of the Teachers College, a position he held until 1939. The campus moved to its current location in Westwood, Los Angeles in 1929. 

In 1930 Los Angeles City Librarian Everett R. Perry proposed to the president of the University of California the establishment of a library school on the Los Angeles campus of the University. By 1935 the School of Librarianship was opened at the University's campus at Berkeley (now the UC Berkeley School of Information), which was later suspended through World War II. UCLA University Librarian Lawrence Clark Powell, among other Los Angeles leaders, resumed the prewar interest in a library school at UCLA. The Regents of the University of California approved the establishment of the school in 1958. Powell (for whom Powell Library is named) resigned his position as University Librarian to become dean of the new school. The school was established with collaboration from the School of Librarianship at Berkeley. The two schools initially created a single alumni association and doctoral students took courses, when appropriate, at either campus. From its inception the school hired faculty from other disciplines, namely mathematician Robert M. Hayes. With innovation in information technology after World War II, library programs became increasingly multidisciplinary, effectively providing a disciplinary home for the interdisciplinary study of information science. Many library schools have since been repositioned as information schools, schools of information science, or schools of library and information science. See the history of information science.

The School of Education and the School of Library and Information Science were incorporated into the Graduate School of Education and Information Studies in 1994. UCLA is the only major research university in the country that combines these two areas of study into a single school or college.

On January 29, 2014, Dean Marcelo Suárez-Orozco became the inaugural Wasserman Dean of Education & Information Studies. The Wasserman Endowed Deanship of Education & Information Studies is made possible by the Wasserman Foundation. It marks a historic milestone for the graduate school and the university as it establishes the very first endowed deanship at UCLA. “This gift from the Wasserman Foundation reflects its investment in both UCLA and Dean Marcelo Suárez-Orozco as transformative leaders in education for greater Los Angeles and beyond,” UCLA Chancellor Gene Block stated. Suárez-Orozco left UCLA to become Chancellor at the University of Massachusetts, Boston and was replaced by Christina A. Christie as the new Wasserman Dean of Education & Information Studies in 2020.

Departments

Department of Education
Consistently ranked within the top ten graduate schools of education by U.S. News & World Report, and currently ranked 3rd in the nation, the Department of Education is committed to understanding and improving education practice in a diverse society. The Department of Education is UCLA's oldest unit, since UCLA was founded as a normal school for the training of teachers. Divisions within the Department of Education include Urban Schooling, Student Affairs, Educational Leadership, Higher Education and Organizational Change, Human Development and Psychology (formerly Psychological Studies in Education), Social Research Methodology, Social Sciences and Comparative Education, among others. The program offers an undergraduate major in Education & Social Transformation, an undergraduate minor in Education Studies, a Master's (awarded after one year of study) and PhD program. The department is especially known for its research in the study of student testing and assessment, teacher and continuing education and development - particularly in urban, multi-ethnic environments, early childhood development, and issues of access, equity and quality facing higher education. The department is home to National Center for Research on Evaluation, Standards, and Student Testing (CRESST), the Higher Education Research Institute (HERI), The Civil Rights Project/Proyecto Derechos Civiles (CRP/PDC), the UC All Campus Consortium On Research and Diversity (UC ACCORD), and the Center for International and Development Education (CIDE), among others.

Department of Information Studies
Accredited by the American Library Association and a founding member of the I-Schools caucus, the Department of Information Studies ranks the 4th most productive and 3rd most highly cited faculty in the latest Budd survey of "Scholarly Productivity of U.S. LIS Faculty" (as measured per capita of faculty). U.S. News & World Report ranks the Master's of Library Science program among the top 13 in the country.

Broadly, the Department of Information Studies examines the application, communication, processing, representation and social consequences of technology. It also studies the structure, behavior, and interactions of natural and engineered computational systems. Traditionally, it is concerned with the gathering, manipulation, classification, storage, and retrieval of recorded knowledge. The central notion is the transformation and dissemination of information - whether by computation or communication, whether by organisms or artifacts. In this sense, it is more or less a merge of artificial intelligence, cognitive science, computing science, and related fields. The UCLA Department of Information Studies is regarded for its cultural studies and social justice approach to Information Studies.

The department offers an undergraduate program in Information Studies; the Master's in Library and Information Science (awarded after two years of study), which has three focus areas: Library Studies, Archival Studies, and Informatics; the PhD in Information Studies; and the Moving Image Archive Studies MA, an inter-departmental program jointly sponsored by the UCLA Film and Television Archive, and the Department of Film, Television and Digital Media in the UCLA School of Theater, Film and Television. The department is home to the California Center for the Book, a division of the Center for the Book, the Center for Information as Evidence, and the California Rare Book School, among many other institutes, programs, and research centers.

The program is known for having a diverse teaching faculty who come from many countries around the world. There are also many adjunct faculty members who teach at the school which adds some vocational instruction to the highly theoretical program.

UCLA Lab School
The UCLA Lab School, a quasi-private, quasi-public-school, has been on the UCLA campus since 1947 and currently serves 450 students ranging in ages 4–12 and their families. Today, Ed&IS's Department of Education is the only such department in the United States that enjoys direct access to an on-campus elementary school. The Lab School classrooms provide an experiential education by serving as laboratories for exploring ideas about teaching, learning, and child development. The school is located on the northern part of the UCLA campus, directly north of the UCLA Anderson School of Management, off Sunset Boulevard. The school has also opened satellite campuses in South Los Angeles, where educators can directly attack the educational challenges posed by poverty, lack of English fluency and achievement gaps on the part of racial and ethnic minorities.

UCLA Community School (UCLA-CS)
UCLA-CS is located at the former Ambassador Hotel site in Mid-Wilshire district of Los Angeles. The school, a part of the Robert F. Kennedy Community Schools, opened its doors in September 2010 to students in grades K-12.

Journals

InterActions
The school's flagship journal is InterActions: UCLA Journal of Education and Information Studies. The journal is "a peer-reviewed on-line journal committed to the promotion of interdisciplinary and critical scholarship. Edited by students in the UCLA School of Education and Information Studies, the journal brings together senior and emerging scholars, activists, and professionals whose work covers a broad range of theory and practice." The journal is an open access journal housed by the Berkeley Electronic Press and the eScholarship initiative of the California Digital Library. The journal's aims and scope are as follows: "InterActions seeks to promote alternative and liberatory visions, methodologies and practices. We are particularly interested in work that analyzes inequities and links research to larger social and political contexts, and we encourage contributions that utilize critical frameworks in provocative and politically engaged ways."

Freire Online Journal
The school also houses the Freire Online Journal, which publishes "Freirean academic, in the field, experimental, and research-based works."

Current degree programs
Doctorate degrees

 Educational Leadership Program (EdD)
 Higher Education and Organizational Change (PhD)
 Human Development and Psychology (PhD)
 Information Studies (PhD)
 Joint Special Education Program with Cal State Los Angeles (PhD)
 Social Research Methodology (PhD)
 Social Sciences & Comparative Education (PhD)
 Urban Schooling (PhD)

Master's degree

 Higher Education and Organizational Change (MA)
 Human Development and Psychology (MA)
 Library and Information Science (MLIS)
 Principal Leadership Institute (MEd)
 Social Research Methodology (MA)
 Social Sciences & Comparative Education (MA)
 Student Affairs (MEd)
 Teacher Education Program (MEd)
 Transformative Coaching and Leadership (MEd)

Bachelor's degree
 Education and Social Transformation (BA)

Centers

 Center for Critical Internet Inquiry (c2i2)
 Center for Critical Race Studies in Education (CCRSE)
 Center for Information as Evidence
 Center for International & Development Education (CIDE)
 Center for Knowledge Infrastructures
 Center for Transformation of Schools
 Center X
 The Civil Rights Project/Proyecto Derechos Civiles
 CONNECT, A Center for Research and Innovation in Elementary Education
 National Center for Research on Evaluation, Standards, and Student Testing (CRESST)
 Pritzker Center for Strengthening Children and Families
 UCLA Center for Community Schooling 
 UCLA Center for Dyslexia, Diverse Learners and Social Justice

Center X
Center X is a coalition of professional credentialing and continuing education programs housed within the UCLA Graduate School of Education and Information Studies. In the past ten years, Center X has awarded the preliminary teaching credential and Master of Education to more than 1700 teachers through its Teacher Education Program (TEP) and the Tier I administrative credential and Master of Education to nearly 400 administrators in training through its Principal Leadership Institute (PLI). Center X was founded in response to a report published by the University of California's Advisory Committee calling for a transformation of the relationship between university teacher training programs and the public schools to employ prospective student teachers. In response to this report and the social upheaval in Los Angeles of the early 1990s, the newly formed center explicitly focused on some of the most impoverished areas in Los Angeles: East Los Angeles, Pico Union, South Los Angeles, and the Crenshaw District. Both of Center X's flagship professional programs, TEP and PLI, have a social justice emphasis as core to their work.

Center X works to staff schools that are underserved, in communities of color, low-income, and with students that have academic needs. Schools that employ TEP Candidates have seen success, particularly in the area of teacher retention. A 2003 study found that "Center X graduates stay in teaching at higher rates than national averages. As expected, retention decreases over time, yet even after 5 years, 70% of Center X graduates remain in the classroom compared to 61% of teachers nationally". For the 2010-2011 academic year, four TEP alumni were selected as  United States Department of Education "Teaching Ambassador Fellows".

Center X is specifically committed to Vygotskyian sociocultural theory and continues to do work around child development through language.

Center X provides ongoing development for urban educators and schools through eight projects. These include  five subject matter Projects (Writing, Reading and Literature, Mathematics, Science, and History-Geography), the UCLA Parent Project, a National Boards Project, and a School Transformation Project.

Institutes

 Black Male Institute (BMI)
 Higher Education Research Institute (HERI)
 Institute for Democracy, Education, & Access (IDEA)
 Institute for Immigration, Globalization and Education 
 Paulo Freire Institute
 Sudikoff Family Institute

Programs

 California Rare Book School
 Teaching to Change LA
 Pacific Bell/UCLA Initiative for 21st Century Literacies
 International Research on Permanent Authentic Records in Electronic Systems (InterPARES)
 REFORMA Los Angeles Chapter (The National Association to Promote Library and Information Services to Latinos and the Spanish Speaking)
 Senior Fellows

Notable faculty

 Alexander Astin
 Alison Bailey
 Eva L. Baker
 Marcia J. Bates
 Christine L. Borgman
 Li Cai
 Michelle Caswell
 Mitchell Chang
 Johanna Drucker
 Anne J. Gilliland
 Sandra Graham
 Sandra Harding
 Robert M. Hayes
 Connie Kasari
 Douglas Kellner
 Seymour Lubetzky
 Jane Margolis
 Safiya Noble
 Mike Rose
 Val D. Rust
 Ramesh Srinivasan
 Carlos Alberto Torres
 Maryanne Wolf

Endowed chairs
 Allan Murray Cartter Chair in Higher Education (Walter R. Allen)
 George F. Kneller Chair in Education & Anthropology (Teresa McCarty)
 George F. Kneller Chair in Education & Philosophy (Christine L. Borgman)
 Martin and Bernard Breslauer Professorship in Bibliography (Johanna Drucker)
 Presidential Chair in Education and Diversity (Sandra Graham)
 Pritzker Family Endowed Chair in Education to Strengthen Families (Tyrone Howard)
 The Wasserman Endowed Deanship of Education & Information Studies (Christine Christie)

Notes

External links
 

Graduate School of Education and Information Studies
Schools of education in California
Information schools
Educational institutions established in 1881
American Library Association accredited library schools
1881 establishments in California